Mariametridae is a family of echinoderms belonging to the order Comatulida.

Genera:
 Dichrometra Clark, 1909
 Lamprometra Clark, 1913
 Mariametra Clark, 1909
 Oxymetra Clark, 1909
 Pelometra Clark, 1941
 Stephanometra Clark, 1909

References

 
Echinoderm families
Comatulida